Patricia Ann Sheehan (September 7, 1931 – January 14, 2006), also known as Patricia Sheehan Crosby, was an American actress and model. She was Playboy magazine's Playmate of the Month for October 1958 and a contract player for NBC.

Early years
She was the daughter of Arthur E Sheehan Sr and Gladys A Larson. Her siblings were Arthur and Edward Sheehan. In October 1949, she won the local Miss Milkmaid pageant, which launched her career. Sheehan was Miss San Francisco of 1950, having performed a monologue. Her prize was a Gensler Lee diamond ring. She took honors for Miss San Francisco and flew to Santa Cruz, California to take part in the 1951 Miss California Pageant where she placed 6th. Sheehan dated and married George von Duuglas-Ittu on January 9, 1951, in Carson City, Nevada. Her first son Franz Nicholas Gregory von Duuglas-ittu was born October 21, 1951  They divorced on January 6, 1954.

Career
Pat Sheehan began appearing on Queen for a Day and the Colgate Comedy Hour in the early 1950s, as well as modeling for various magazines. She was discovered by Howard Hughes who signed her for his films The French Line and Son of Sinbad. She posed for magazines such as TV Fan, People Today, and TV Guide.

She was in movies such as Kismet, Man with the Gun, Daddy Long Legs, and The Adventures of Hajji Baba.

She was signed to NBC in January 1956, starring in The NBC Comedy Hour, with appearances on The Milton Berle Show, Texaco Star Theater, and The Chevy Show. Agnes Moorehead was her acting coach during this period, while Meredith Willson was her vocal coach. Her co-star, Jonathan Winters said of her, "Pat Sheehan? Lovely, yes lovely." She appeared in an episode of Blondie and had a dramatic role in an episode of Matinee Theater.

She was Playboy magazine's Playmate of the Month for October 1958, tied with Mara Corday. Her centerfold was photographed by Sam Wu. Her centerfold was in Space Cowboys. Gigi was her last movie, in 1958.

She dated Frank Sinatra, Phillip Lambro, and Rod Taylor. Shortly after Bing Crosby's first wife, Dixie Lee, died of ovarian cancer, he started dating Sheehan. Eventually, Crosby proposed to her. On May 4, 1958, she married Crosby's son, Dennis Crosby in Las Vegas, Nevada at The Tropicana Hotel where she was a showgirl. They had two children: Dennis Jr. and Patrick Anthony, and Franz Nicholas Gregory who Dennis adopted from the previous marriage in December 1958, rechristened Gregory Crosby. They divorced on July 3, 1964.

Later life
In her later years, Sheehan lived in Beverly Hills, California with her friend Gloria Haley Parnassus (Jack Haley's daughter). She was employed with Gucci, and did her last interview in 1995 for The Playmate Book: Five Decades of Centerfolds. After surviving cancer, she died of a heart attack on January 14, 2006, in Beverly Hills, California, aged 74 and was interred at Forest Lawn Memorial Park. Her sons, Dennis and Patrick, died years later.

Legacy
In addition to being the first Playmate to tie for Playboy's Playmate of the Month, Pat Sheehan was the first bit player to be signed to a television contract. She was known as one of Hollywood's most beautiful women, often being labeled as "Television's Marilyn Monroe" and "The Blonde Rita Hayworth." Mike Connolly described her as “The Rich Man's Jayne Mansfield” while they performed alongside each other in The Tropicana Holiday. Kathryn Crosby described her as "the warmest, friendliest girl I've ever known." On April 26, 2019, she was posthumously inducted into the Galileo Academy of Science and Technology Hall of Merit. Her authorized biography, Pat: A Biography of Hollywood's Blonde Starlet by Samuel Clemens was published by Sequoia Press on May 22, 2020. A lot of her photographs, memorabilia, and footage are archived at the San Francisco History Center, the San Francisco Public Library, the Bancroft Library, and the Los Angeles Public Library.

Filmography

Television
 Queen for a Day (recurring episodes, 1952-1953), Model
 The Bob Hope Show (recurring episodes, 1954) Dancer
 Place the Face (1955) TV Episode
 The Colgate Comedy Hour, episodes #5.19 and 6.7 (1955) TV Episodes, Mildred
 The NBC Comedy Hour 1.5, 1.6, 1.7, 1.10, and 1.17 (5 episodes, 1956) TV episode, Herself
 The Milton Berle Show (recurring episodes, 1956), Dancer
 The Jimmy Durante Show (recurring episodes, 1955-1956), Dancer
 Inside Beverly Hills (1956) TV Episode, Self
 Salute to Baseball (1956) TV Episode, Self
 Home (May 24, 1956) TV Episode, Self
 The Chevy Show (1956) TV Episode, Dancer
 Matinee Theater (March 1956 and April 12, 1956) TV Episodes, Bohemian Artist
 People are Funny (1957) TV Episode, Miss Univac
 Blondie (1 episode, 1957) The Other Woman (1957) TV Episode Librarian,

See also

List of people in Playboy 1953–1959

References

External links
 
 
 Glamour Girls of the Silver Screen

1931 births
2006 deaths
American beauty pageant winners
Actresses from San Francisco
1950s Playboy Playmates
20th-century American women
21st-century American women
American dancers
American actresses
American showgirls